Canindé River may refer to rivers:

in Brazil
 Canindé River (Ceará)
 Canindé River (Piauí)

in Ecuador
 Canindé River (Ecuador)

See also 
 Canindé (disambiguation)